Unlike most of the cities in Karnataka, Mangalore city bus routes are dominated by private buses. 

State Bank, Kankanadi, KSRTC, Surathkal are important bus stations in the city.

See also 
 Dakshina Kannada Bus Operators' Association

References 

Transport in Mangalore